Dorchester is a village in Macoupin County, Illinois, United States. The population was 133 at the 2020 census.

Geography
Dorchester is located in southern Macoupin County at  (39.08759, -89.88660).

The village drains eastward to the West Fork of Cahokia Creek, which leads south, then west, to the Mississippi River near St. Louis.

Demographics

As of the census of 2000, there were 142 people, 58 households, and 40 families residing in the village. The racial makeup of the village was 99.30% White, and 0.70% from two or more races.

There were 58 households, of which 22.4% had children under the age of 18 living with them, 62.1% were married couples living together, 1.7% had a female householder with no husband present, and 31.0% were non-families. 27.6% of all households were made up of individuals, and 13.8% had someone living alone who was 65 years of age or older. The average household size was 2.45 and the average family size was 3.00.

In the village, the population was spread out, with 24.6% under the age of 18, 5.6% from 18 to 24, 31.0% from 25 to 44, 25.4% from 45 to 64, and 13.4% who were 65 years of age or older. The median age was 40 years. For every 100 females, there were 105.8 males. For every 100 females age 18 and over, there were 91.1 males.

The median income for a household in the village was $37,500, and the median income for a family was $45,625. Males had a median income of $37,500 versus $18,333 for females. The per capita income for the village was $17,753. There were none of the families and 5.6% of the population living below the poverty line, including no under eighteens and 23.1% of those over 64.

References

Villages in Macoupin County, Illinois
Villages in Illinois